Hanna is an unincorporated community in western Duchesne County, Utah, United States, on the Uintah and Ouray Indian Reservation.

Description

Although Hanna is unincorporated, it has its own ZIP code of 84031 and, for many years, even had its own post office.

Hanna was named for its original postmaster, William P. Hanna. Historically, the name Defas Park (a former resort in Hanna, with a dance hall and cabins) often appeared on maps at the location of the community, with the name Hanna appearing at a location further west.

Climate
This climatic region is typified by large seasonal temperature differences, with warm to hot (and often humid) summers and cold (sometimes severely cold) winters.  According to the Köppen Climate Classification system, Hanna has a humid continental climate, abbreviated "Dfb" on climate maps.

See also

References

External links

Unincorporated communities in Duchesne County, Utah
Unincorporated communities in Utah